The Woodruff House is located in Hillside, Union County, New Jersey, United States. The house was built in 1735 and was added to the National Register of Historic Places on December 11, 1978.

See also 
 National Register of Historic Places listings in Union County, New Jersey
 List of the oldest buildings in New Jersey

References

Hillside, New Jersey
Houses on the National Register of Historic Places in New Jersey
Houses completed in 1850
Houses in Union County, New Jersey
National Register of Historic Places in Union County, New Jersey
New Jersey Register of Historic Places